This is a list of museums with major collections of Greek and Roman antiquities.

 Naples Archaeological Museum, Naples, Italy
130,000 objects 
 State Hermitage, St Petersburg, Russia
 106,000 objects (Misleading collection, includes many objects from ancient settlements on the Northern Black Sea coast)
 British Museum, London, UK
 100,000 objects
 National Archaeological Museum, Athens, Greece
 100,000 objects
 Antikensammlung Berlin, (Held at the Altes Museum, Neues Museum and Pergamon Museum), Berlin, Germany
 60,000 objects
 Istanbul Archaeology Museum, Istanbul, Turkey
 53,000 objects (Misleading Collection. Total collection size: 1 million objects of which 800,000 coins, 75,000 books, 75,000 Ancient Near East cuneiform tablets, 2000 enamels and various Ancient Near Eastern objects)
 Musée du Louvre, Paris, France
 45,000 objects
 Getty Villa, Malibu, USA
 44,000 objects
 Metropolitan Museum of Art, New York, USA
 35,000 objects
 University of Pennsylvania Museum of Archaeology and Anthropology, Pennsylvania, USA
 30,000 objects
 Museum of Fine Arts, Boston, USA
 18,000 objects (Misleading collection, includes Nubian and Ancient Near East collections)

References

Greek And Roman Antiquities
Greek And Roman Antiquities

Museums
Museums